Ape is a town in Latvia near the Estonian border.

Notable people
Andris Šķēle, Latvian businessman, former politician, Prime Minister of Latvia.

See also
List of cities in Latvia

References

Towns in Latvia
1928 establishments in Latvia
Populated places established in 1928
Smiltene Municipality
Vidzeme